Listening for Lions is a children's novel by Gloria Whelan, first published in 2005. Set in 1919, it concerns an orphaned girl who becomes involved in an inheritance swindle.

Plot summary
Rachel Sheridan is the only child of British missionaries working among the Kikuyu and Masai tribes of British East Africa (present-day Kenya). Her father is a doctor and her mother a teacher. Life goes haywire as an influenza epidemic strikes when Rachel is 13, in 1919. Many die from the sickness, including her mother. The Pritchards, arrogant planters who live nearby, bring their daughter Valerie to the hospital, but it is too late to save her. After Rachel's father dies and it looks as if the hospital will be closed, Rachel is taken in by the Pritchards.  They persuade the reluctant Rachel to impersonate their daughter, sending her in Valerie's place to visit her dying grandfather in England, on the pretext that it will save his life. Rachel considers telling people of the Pritchards' lies on the ship, but she soon arrives in England and begins to develop a close relationship with her "grandfather", who, like her, is very fond of birds. Just as things begin to get better, the Pritchards' unveil their new plot, to take the grandfather's property when he dies. In scorn of his son, the grandfather sends them away, but his trusty solicitor, Mr. Grumbloch, gives Rachel his address and tells her to come in an emergency. Rachel comes within the day, and he returns her to her grandfather, telling him the truth, which they have already suspected. There is an epilogue at the end of the novel, in which Rachel becomes his adopted daughter and attends school, later returning to her father's hospital as a doctor.

Critical reception
The audiobook recording of Listening for Lions received an Audie Award as well as AudioFile magazine's Earphones Award. AudioFile called the story "solid" and Bianca Amato's narration "stellar" However, Most people can agree that the book is pretty bad.

References

2005 American novels
American children's novels
Children's historical novels
Novels set in the 1910s
2005 children's books
Novels by Gloria Whelan